Performance measurement is the process of collecting, analyzing and/or reporting information regarding the performance of an individual, group, organization, system or component.

Definitions of performance measurement tend to be predicated upon an assumption about why the performance is being measured.
 Moullin defines the term with a forward looking organisational focus—"the process of evaluating how well organisations are managed and the value they deliver for customers and other stakeholders".
 Neely et al. use a more operational retrospective focus—"the process of quantifying the efficiency and effectiveness of past actions".
 In 2007 the Office of the Chief Information Officer in the USA defined it using a more evaluative focus—"Performance measurement estimates the parameters under which programs, investments, and acquisitions are reaching the targeted results". 

Beyond a simple agreement about it being linked to some kind of measurement of performance there is little consensus about how to define or use performance measures. In the light of this what has happened is the emergence of organising frameworks that incorporate performance measures and often also proscribe methods for choosing and using the appropriate measures for that application. The most common such frameworks include:
 Balanced scorecard—used by organisations to manage the implementation of corporate strategies
 Key performance indicator—a method for choosing important/critical performance measures, usually in an organisational context

Operational standards often include pre-defined lists of standard performance measures. For example EN 15341 identifies 71 performance indicators, whereof 21 are technical indicators, or those in a US Federal Government directive from 1999—National Partnership for Reinventing Government, USA; Balancing Measures: Best Practices in Performance Management, August 1999.

Defining performance measures or methods by which they can be chosen is also a popular activity for academics—for example a list of railway infrastructure indicators is offered by Stenström et al., a novel method for measure selection is proposed by Mendibil et al.

Academic articles that provide critical reviews of performance measurement in specific domains are also common—e.g. Ittner's observations on non-financial reporting by commercial organisations,; Boris et al.'s observations about use of performance measurement in non-profit organisations, or Bühler et al.'s (2016) analysis of how external turbulence could be reflected in performance measurement systems.

The use of performance measurement system in company is very important, but is rarely used by Small and Medium Enterprises. The use of KPIs as a strategy of management in achieving performance in line with different purposes of an organization, such as research management of a research institute, could be considered as a complex scenario in this context. However, tools that facilitate unique, unambiguous, and homogeneous management of performance, for example KPI-index to integrate all performance indicators from bottom to top of each and every layer of an organization are supposed to act as strategies for better performance management of complex performance management systems.

References

Organizational performance management